Damon Arnette (born September 2, 1996) is an American football cornerback who is a free agent, and an American rapper. He played college football at Ohio State and was drafted by the Las Vegas Raiders in the first round of the 2020 NFL Draft.

Early years and high school
Arnette was born in Dallas, Texas and moved to Fort Lauderdale, Florida when he was three years old. He attended St. Thomas Aquinas High School, where he played linebacker and wide receiver for the Raiders. He was named honorable mention Class 8A-7A-6A All-County as a senior and helped lead the team to a state championship. Rated a three-star recruit, Arnette originally committed to play college football at South Carolina during the summer going into his senior year before changing his commitment to Ohio State on national signing day.

College career
Arnette redshirted his true freshman season after a bone chip was discovered in his tibia during training camp. He played in 13 of Ohio State's games the following season as a key reserve at defensive back and recorded 21 tackles with one interception. As a redshirt sophomore, Arnette started 12 of the Buckeyes 14 games and led the team's cornerbacks with 44 tackles with two interceptions and eight passes broken up and was named honorable mention All-Big Ten Conference. Arnette was again named honorable mention as a junior, 40 tackles and one interception in 13 games played. Arnette originally planned to leave school and forgo his final season of NCAA eligibility to enter the 2019 NFL draft, but eventually decided to return to Ohio State for his final year of eligibility.

Arnette scored his first career touchdown on September 14, 2019 on a 97-yard interception return against Indiana. Arnette was named second-team All-Big Ten at the end of the season, recording 35 tackles, eight passes defended and one interception while playing with a broken wrist.

College statistics

Professional career

Las Vegas Raiders
Arnette was drafted by the Las Vegas Raiders in the first round with the 19th overall pick of the 2020 NFL Draft. The Raiders previously obtained the 19th selection as part of the trade that sent Khalil Mack to the Chicago Bears in 2018. He was placed on injured reserve on October 2, 2020 with a thumb injury. He was moved to the reserve/COVID-19 list by the team on October 19, and was moved back to injured reserve on October 30. He was activated to the active roster on November 14, 2020.

Arnette entered the 2021 season as a backup cornerback behind Trayvon Mullen and Casey Hayward. He suffered a groin injury in Week 4 and was placed on injured reserve. The Raiders released him on November 8, 2021, after the discovery of a video showing him brandishing firearms and making death threats.

Miami Dolphins
On December 15, 2021, Arnette was signed to the Miami Dolphins practice squad. His contract expired when the team's season ended on January 9, 2022.

Kansas City Chiefs
Arnette signed a reserve/futures contract with the Kansas City Chiefs on January 20, 2022. He was released on January 29, 2022 after he was arrested on charges of assault with a deadly weapon, carrying a concealed weapon without a permit, and two counts of possession of controlled substances in Las Vegas.

Personal life
Arnette is also a rapper under the stage name NWG Suave.

Legal issues
On November 5, 2021, Arnette was accused of injuring a woman in a 2020 car crash. On October 14, 2020, Arnette allegedly slammed into the woman's car after missing a turn on the way to team practice, then left the scene. The crash occurred with Arnette traveling at 65 miles per hour, which allegedly caused the woman "head trauma" and "shoulder, neck, and back pain as well as depression and panic attacks."

On November 8, 2021, a video was discovered of Arnette in which he brandished firearms and was making death threats. This video led to his release from the Raiders.

On January 29, 2022, Arnette was arrested in Las Vegas, Nevada on charges of assault with a deadly weapon, carrying a concealed weapon without a permit, and two counts of possession of controlled substances. On July 25, 2022, Las Vegas authorities announced no criminal charges would be filed.

On the night of July 25, 2022, Arnette was pulled over and found to have a suspended license. He was released with the police allowing the passenger to drive the vehicle. Hours later, shortly after midnight on July 26, 2022 Arnette was again pulled over driving the same vehicle, and this time was placed under arrest and charged with possession of a controlled substance, possession of drug paraphernalia and driving on a suspended license. He was later released on bond.

NFL career statistics

References

External links
Ohio State Buckeyes bio
Las Vegas Raiders bio

1996 births
Living people
Players of American football from Fort Lauderdale, Florida
St. Thomas Aquinas High School (Florida) alumni
American football cornerbacks
Ohio State Buckeyes football players
Las Vegas Raiders players
Miami Dolphins players
Kansas City Chiefs players